Archaeoceratops, meaning "ancient horned face", is a genus of basal neoceratopsian dinosaur from the Early Cretaceous (Aptian stage) of north central China. It had a comparatively large head but no horns, possessing only a small bony frill projecting from the back of its head.

Discovery and species
 

Two specimens were found in the Middle Gray Unit of the Xinminbao Group, Gongpoquan Basin of the Mazong Shan area of Gansu Province, north central China. The type species, A. oshimai, was named by Dong Zhiming and Azuma in 1997. It is the first basal neoceratopsian discovered in this area.

The type specimen, IVPP V11114, consists of a partially complete skeleton including skull, caudal vertebrae, pelvis, and most of a hind foot.
The second specimen (paratype), IVPP V11115, consists of an incomplete skeleton with a relatively well preserved caudal series, a partial hind limb, and a completely preserved foot. It is slightly smaller than the holotype.

Classification
Archaeoceratops belonged to the Ceratopsia (the name is Greek for "horned face"), a group of herbivorous dinosaurs with parrot-like beaks which thrived in North America and Asia during the Cretaceous Period. In 1997 Dong and Azuma placed it in a new family, Archaeoceratopsidae. Helioceratops and possibly Yamaceratops have also been found to be members of Archaeoceratopsidae.

Diet
Archaeoceratops, like all ceratopsians, was a herbivore. During the Cretaceous, flowering plants were "geographically limited on the landscape", and so it is likely that this dinosaur fed on the predominant plants of the era: ferns, cycads and conifers. It would have used its sharp beak to bite off the leaves or needles and chop them up to be swallowed.

See also

 Timeline of ceratopsian research

References

Sources

Archaeoceratops in the Dino Directory

Neoceratopsians
Early Cretaceous dinosaurs of Asia
Fossil taxa described in 1997
Taxa named by Dong Zhiming
Paleontology in Gansu
Ornithischian genera